Cordovez is a surname. Notable people with the surname include: 

Diego Cordovez (born 1965), American poker player
Ivette Cordovez (born 1979), Panamanian news presenter, actress, and model
José María Cordovez Moure (1835–1918), Colombian writer and historian
María Eugenia Cordovez (1934–2012), First Lady of Ecuador, 1984-88